The Chicago "L" is a rapid transit system that serves the city of Chicago and seven of its surrounding suburbs. The system is operated by the Chicago Transit Authority (CTA). On an average weekday, 759,866 passengers ride the "L",  making it the second-busiest rapid transit system in the United States, behind the New York City Subway.

The system began as three separate companies, which built lines traveling from Chicago's central business district to the south and the west. The first of these was the Chicago and South Side Rapid Transit Railroad which opened on June 6, 1892. The Lake Street Elevated Railroad opened the following year and the Metropolitan West Side Elevated Railroad followed in 1895. Initially, the "L" lines operated independently of each other, but in 1897, they were combined into one physically unified system with the completion of the Union Loop and connecting trackage.  In 1900, the Northwestern Elevated Railroad entered operation, finalizing the basic structure of the system: a hub and spoke distribution paradigm radiating north, west, and south from downtown Chicago. The system expanded outward from this with new branches or line extensions until 1930. 

Due to the ruined financial state of the privately owned Chicago Rapid Transit Company and the Chicago Surface Lines, a public agency (the CTA) was created  in 1947 to take over and save the rapid transit and streetcar systems. Starting in 1948, the CTA began systematically shutting down many stations and lines that saw little use in order to improve service and reduce costs. Expansion resumed in September 1969 with the opening of a new line in the median of the Dan Ryan Expressway and continued until October 31, 1993, with the opening of the Orange Line. The newest line the Pink Line, which opened on June 25, 2006 was created by rerouting the Blue Line's Douglas branch into a separate service.

A total of 103 stations are compliant with the Americans with Disabilities Act of 1990 and are accessible to passengers with disabilities. The majority of "L" stations are named for the streets or intersections on which they are located; others are named for neighborhoods, suburbs, destinations, or a combination of these.

Lines

Stations

Gallery

Planned stations

Notes
 On May 16, 1908, the Northwestern Elevated Railroad's rapid transit service replaced the service of the Milwaukee Road's Evanston branch north of Sheridan Park (Wilson Avenue). Stations noted existed prior to the start of "L" service. 
 Clark/Lake is listed twice because the elevated and subway sections opened as separate stations in 1895 and 1951, respectively. 
 Forest Park existed as an interurban station on the Aurora Elgin and Chicago Railway prior to the start of "L" service. March 11, 1905, is the day the Metropolitan West Side Elevated Railroad began operating over the tracks of the AE&C and "L" service began.

References

External links

Elevated Railway Stations
Stations on the L
Chicago El stations
Lists of Illinois railway stations